Laucha may refer to the following places in Germany:

Laucha an der Unstrut, a town in the Burgenlandkreis, Saxony-Anhalt
Laucha, Thuringia, a municipality in the district of Gotha, Thuringia
Laucha (Hörsel), a river of Thuringia, tributary of the Hörsel